The 5th Arabian Gulf Cup was the fifth edition of the Arabian Gulf Cup. The tournament was held at the Al-Shaab Stadium in Baghdad, Iraq and took place between 23 March and 9 April 1979. Hosts Iraq won their first ever title after defeating Saudi Arabia 2–0 on 8 April 1979, becoming the second team to win the competition after Kuwait.

Originally, the tournament was scheduled to take place in 1978 and hosted in Abu Dhabi, the United Arab Emirates, but it was delayed after the UAE gave up their hosting rights.

Teams

Venues

Match officials

Tournament
The seven teams in the tournament played a single round-robin style competition. The team achieving first place in the overall standings was the tournament winner.

All times are local, AST (UTC+3).

Matches

Winners

Statistics

Goalscorers

Awards
Player of the Tournament
 Hadi Ahmed

Top Scorer
 Hussein Saeed (10 goals)

Goalkeeper of the Tournament
 Raad Hammoudi

References

External links 
 Official Site (Arabic)

1979
1979
1979 in Asian football
1978–79 in Saudi Arabian football
1978–79 in Iraqi football
1978–79 in Emirati football
1978–79 in Kuwaiti football
1978–79 in Qatari football
1978–79 in Bahraini football
1979 in Oman